Martin Carthy is the debut solo album by English folk musician Martin Carthy, originally released in 1965 by Fontana Records and later re-issued by Topic Records. The album features Dave Swarbrick  playing fiddle or mandolin on a number of the tracks. Swarbrick was not headlined on the album for contractual reasons as he was with the Ian Campbell Folk Group at the time with permission granted by Transatlantic Records.

The song notes on the album are written by Martin with Ian Campbell writing the introduction.

All the tracks are Traditional except "Springhill Mine Disaster". which was written by Ewan MacColl and Peggy Seeger following the 1958 disaster and "The Wind That Shakes the Barley" which was written by Robert Dwyer Joyce.

Track listing
The references after the titles below are from the three major numbering schemes for traditional folk songs, the Roud Folk Song Index, Child Ballad Numbers  and the Laws Numbers.
All tracks Traditional, arranged by Martin Carthy; except where indicated

Personnel
 Martin Carthy - guitar, vocals
 Dave Swarbrick - fiddle, mandolin (uncredited)
Technical
Tony Engle - sleeve design
Ian Campbell, Martin Carthy - sleeve notes

Album information
First released in the UK 1965 by Fontana Records STL 5269 (Stereo) / TL5269 (Mono)
Re-issued 1977 by Topic Records 12TS340 with 5 other Martin Carthy albums
CD issued 1993 by Topic Records TSCD340
 180g vinyl limited edition 50th anniversary release re-issue for Record Store Day 18 April 2015 by Topic records 12TS2015

References 

Martin Carthy albums
1965 debut albums
Fontana Records albums
Topic Records albums